A variety of symbols or iconographic conventions are used to represent Earth, whether in the sense of planet Earth, or the inhabited world, or as a classical element. A circle representing the round world, with the rivers of Garden of Eden separating the four corners of the world, or rotated 45° to suggest the four continents, remains a common pictographic convention to express the notion of "worldwide". The current astronomical symbol for the planet is a circle with an intersecting cross, . Although the International Astronomical Union (IAU) now discourages the use of planetary symbols, this is an exception, being used in abbreviations such as M🜨 for Earth mass.

History
The earliest type of symbols are allegories, personifications or deifications, mostly in the form of an Earth goddess (in the case of Egyptian mythology a god, Geb).

Before the recognition of the spherical shape of the Earth in the Hellenistic period, the main attribute of the Earth was its being flat. The Egyptian hieroglyph for "earth, land" depicts a stretch of flat alluvial land with grains of sand (Gardiner N16: 𓇾). The Sumerian cuneiform sign for "earth, place" KI (𒆠) originates as a picture of a "threshing floor", and the Chinese character (土) originated as a lump of clay on a potting wheel.

Earth, the classical element
In Chinese mysticism, the classical element "Earth" is represented by the trigram of three broken lines in the I Ching (☷). 

The Western (early modern) alchemical symbol for earth is a downward-pointing triangle bisected by a horizontal line (🜃). Other symbols for the earth in alchemy or mysticism include the square and the serpent.

The planet
In the Roman period, the globe, a representation of the spherical Earth, became the main symbol representing the concept.
The globe depicted the "universe" (pictured as the celestial sphere) as well as the Earth.

 
The globus cruciger (♁) is the globe surmounted by a Christian cross, held by Byzantine Emperors on the one hand to represent the Christian ecumene, on the other hand the akakia represented the mortal nature of all men.

In the medieval period, the known world was also represented by the T-and-O figure, representing an extremely simplified world map of the three classical continents of the Old World, viz.

Unicode encodes four characters representing the globe in the Miscellaneous Symbols and Pictographs block:
EARTH GLOBE EUROPE-AFRICA  U+1F30D 
EARTH GLOBE AMERICAS  U+1F30E 
EARTH GLOBE ASIA-AUSTRALIA  U+1F30F 
GLOBE WITH MERIDIANS  U+1F310

See also

 
 
 
 Flag of Earth
 
 
 
 
 
 
 
 Crossed O, Cyrillic letter of similar appearance

References

External links

Alchemical symbols
Symbol
Astronomical symbols